Rosenbach may refer to:

 The Rosenbach Museum & Library in Philadelphia
 Rosenbach, Görlitz, a town in eastern Saxony, Germany
 Rosenbach, Vogtland, a town in western Saxony, Germany
 Rosenbach, Austria, a village in Carinthia
 Rosenbach (White Elster), a river of Saxony, Germany, tributary of the White Elster
 Rosenbach (Vils), a river of Bavaria, Germany, tributary of the Vils
 Rosenbach (surname)
 the German name for Rožnik Hill, a hill northwest of the Ljubljana city center in Slovenia
 the German name for Rožnik, Grosuplje, a village in the Municipality of Grosuplje, central Slovenia